"Sally" is a song by gypsy punk band Gogol Bordello, written by frontman Eugene Hütz. The song was packaged as a double single along with "Start Wearing Purple", and released as the band's second single in February 2006. It belongs to their third album Gypsy Punks: Underdog World Strike.

Meaning 
The song talks about a Cultural Revolution, and implies that this also belongs to the younger generations. In 2009 the band held an open competition to design Sally drawings.

The Sally character is also mentioned in the band's song "Avenue B", which is featured in the same album.

References

Gogol Bordello songs
2006 singles
2005 songs
Song recordings produced by Steve Albini